Blough is an unincorporated community and coal town in Somerset County, Pennsylvania, United States.

References

Unincorporated communities in Somerset County, Pennsylvania
Coal towns in Pennsylvania
Unincorporated communities in Pennsylvania